Heinrich Friedrich Karl Ludwig Burkhardt (15 October 1861 – 2 November 1914) was a German mathematician. He famously was one of the two examiners of Albert Einstein's PhD thesis Eine neue Bestimmung der Moleküldimensionen. Of Einstein's thesis he stated: "The mode of treatment demonstrates fundamental mastery of the relevant mathematical methods" and "What I checked, I found to be correct without exception."

Biography
Burkhardt was born in Schweinfurt.  Starting from 1879 he studied under Karl Weierstrass, Alexander von Brill, and Hermann Amandus Schwarz in Munich (at university and technical university), Berlin and Göttingen. He attained a doctorate in 1886 in Munich under Gustav Conrad Bauer with a thesis entitled: Beziehungen zwischen der Invariantentheorie und der Theorie algebraischer Integrale und ihrer Umkehrungen (Relations between the invariant theory and the theory of algebraic integrals and their inverses).

In 1887 he was an assistant at Göttingen and obtained his habilitation there in 1889. Later he was a professor in Zürich (1897–1908) and Munich (since October 1908). He worked on the theory of the elliptical functions, series expansions, group theory, the Burkhardt quartic, and history of mathematics.

He died in Neuwittelsbach/München, of a disease of the stomach, diagnosed about Easter 1914.

Works
 1899: Elliptische Funktionen, zweiter Tiel, from Internet Archive
 1903: Algebraische Analysis, from Internet Archive
 1908: Entwicklungen nach oscillierenden Funktionen und Integration der Differentialgleichungen der mathematischen physick
 1913: Theory of Functions of a Complex Variable, translated by S.E. Rasor, link from Internet Archive

See also
Alfred Kleiner

References

External links
 

 
 Einstein's dissertation
 Heinrich Liebmann „Zur Erinnerung an Heinrich Burkhardt“, Jahresbericht DMV Bd.24, 1915, S.185-195

19th-century German mathematicians
20th-century German mathematicians
German historians of mathematics
Technical University of Munich alumni
Academic staff of the Technical University of Munich
1861 births
1914 deaths